St. Louis-San Francisco Railroad Depot is a historic train station located at Poplar Bluff, Butler County, Missouri.  The station was built in 1928 by the St. Louis–San Francisco Railway. It is a one-story, Mission Revival style brick building sheathed in textured stucco. It sits on a concrete foundation, has a gable and hipped Spanish tile roof, and features two interior brick and stucco chimneys. The building is presently occupied as a railroad museum.

It was added to the National Register of Historic Places in 1994.

References

External links
Railroad Museum

Railway stations on the National Register of Historic Places in Missouri
Mission Revival architecture in Missouri
Railway stations in the United States opened in 1928
Buildings and structures in Butler County, Missouri
Poplar Bluff
National Register of Historic Places in Butler County, Missouri
Former railway stations in Missouri